Belorechensk is a town in Krasnodar Krai, Russia, located on the Belaya River, from which it takes its name. It forms the municipal formation Belorechenskoye urban settlement, as the only locality in its composition. Population: 51,590 (2020),

History
It was established as a Cossack settlement in 1862. Town status was granted to it in 1958. During the Soviet period, a corrective labor camp was located here. Belorechensk-White Rechensk was briefly occupied by Germany in the Second World War.

Administrative and municipal status
Within the framework of administrative divisions, Belorechensk serves as the administrative center of Belorechensky District, even though it is not a part of it. As an administrative division, it is, together with the territory of Yuzhny Rural Okrug (which comprises three rural localities), incorporated separately as the Town of Belorechensk—an administrative unit with the status equal to that of the districts. As a municipal division, the town of Belorechensk is incorporated within Belorechensky Municipal District as Belorechenskoye Urban Settlement. Yuzhny Rural Okrug is incorporated within Belorechensky Municipal District as Yuzhnenskoye Rural Settlement.

References

Notes

Sources

External links
Official website of Belorechensk 
Directory of organizations in Belorechensk 

Cities and towns in Krasnodar Krai
1862 establishments in the Russian Empire